Frederick William Harris (born 12 November 1934) is a former English cricketer.  Harris was a right-handed batsman who bowled right-arm fast-medium.  He was born in Chesham, Buckinghamshire.

Harris made his debut for Buckinghamshire in the 1957 Minor Counties Championship against Norfolk.  Harris played Minor counties cricket for Buckinghamshire from 1957 to 1976, which included 90 Minor Counties Championship matches.  In 1965, he made his List A debut against Middlesex in the Gillette Cup.  He played 6 further List A matches for Buckinghamshire, the last coming against Middlesex in the 1975 Gillette Cup.  In his 6 List A matches, he scored 30 runs at a batting average of 6.00, with a high score of 13.  With the ball he took 11 wickets at a bowling average of 19.45, with best figures of 4/21.  His best figures came against Cambridgeshire, where in partnership with Raymond Bond (5/17), he helped bowl Cambridgeshire out for 41.  This at the time was the joint lowest total a team had been bowled out for in List A cricket.

References

External links
Frederick Harris at ESPNcricinfo
Frederick Harris at CricketArchive

1934 births
Living people
People from Chesham
People from Buckinghamshire
English cricketers
Buckinghamshire cricketers